Commotria rhodoneura is a species of snout moth in the genus Commotria. It was described by George Hampson, in 1918, and is known from South Africa.

References

Endemic moths of South Africa
Moths described in 1918
Anerastiini